"Until We Rich" is a single by Ice Cube featuring Krayzie Bone, from Ice Cube's 2000 album, War & Peace Vol. 2 (The Peace Disc). The song conveys the message that the most important things in the world are health and life. The beat, produced by Carl "Chucky" Thompson, contains a sample of "Show Me" by Glenn Jones that was also used in Queensbridge rapper AZ's Pieces of a Man album track "How Ya Livin" featuring Nas. It peaked at number 50 on the Billboard Hot R&B/Hip-Hop Singles & Tracks chart.

References

Ice Cube songs
Krayzie Bone songs
Song recordings produced by Dr. Dre
Songs written by Ice Cube
1998 songs
Songs written by Krayzie Bone

2000 singles